Hamilton, the tenth-largest city in Canada, has hosted visits by the Canadian royal family since the 19th century.

See also
 Historical timeline of events in Hamilton, Ontario

References

History of Hamilton, Ontario
Monarchy in Canada
Hamilton